Layiwola "Lai" Mohammed  (born 6 December 1951) is a Nigerian lawyer and politician. He is currently the Minister of Information and Culture, a position he has held since November 2015. He is also the former National publicity secretary of the All Progressives Congress.

Biography 
He was born into the family of Alhaji Mohammed Adekeye in 1952. He is a native of Oro in Kwara State. He earned a bachelor's degree in French from Obafemi Awolowo University,  in the year 1975.  He proceeded to obtain a law degree from the University of Lagos, and then Nigerian Law School in 1986
As a practising Lawyer, Alhaji Lai Mohammed co-founded the legal firm of Edu & Mohammed as a senior partner in 1989.

Business
Mohammed is a businessman and served as the Chairman of Optmedia Limited, a subsidiary of Afromedia PLC since 18 December 2008. He served as a Director of Afromedia PLC since May 2011. Alhaji Mohammed is also a fellow of the Nigerian Institute of Public Relations (NIPR) and worked as Public Relations Officer for almost 10 years with the Nigerian Airport Authority, now Federal Airport Authority of Nigeria (FAAN).

Politics
In October 2002, Alhaji Lai Mohammed was a candidate for governor in the April 2003 Kwara State elections on the Alliance for Democracy platform. He was assaulted and five vehicles in his convoy were smashed in front of Senator Suleiman Ajadi's campaign office at Oke-Onigbin during a festivity. He served as Governor Tinubu's Chief of Staff during his first term.

Mohammed is an active politician and was the National Publicity Secretary of All Progressive Congress (APC) in Nigeria. He was on 11 November 2015 sworn in by President Muhammadu Buhari as Minister of Information and Culture following his appointment and successful screening by the Nigerian Senate. On 21 August 2019 he was again sworn in by President Muhammadu Buhari as Minister of information and culture.

He has been accused by some local and international news about giving contradictory accounts of events in his country and false information. This is evidential in his #EndSARS accounts, which were at first, different from those claimed by the Lagos State government and the Nigerian Army. In his interview with DW TV, Tim Sebastian accused him of being "out of the loops" of his country's politics.

He had accused CNN of being "desperate", after the international media released several footages, to prove the massacre of the protesters at the Lekki tollgate, Lagos, Nigeria. However, the CNN had requested for substantial proofs, to prove that the media outlet had reported "Fake news", as he claimed.

Award
In October 2022, a Nigerian national honour of Commander of the Order of the Niger (CON) was conferred on him by President Muhammadu Buhari.

See also
Cabinet of Nigeria

References

1952 births
Living people
All Progressives Congress politicians
20th-century Nigerian lawyers
Obafemi Awolowo University alumni
University of Lagos alumni
Nigerian Law School alumni